Temple Footbridge is a pedestrian only bridge near Hurley, Berkshire across the River Thames in England. It connects the Buckinghamshire and Berkshire banks. It crosses the Thames just above Temple Lock.

The bridge was built in 1989 specifically for walkers on the Thames Path. Previously walkers on the Thames Path had been required to take a detour away from the river bank along a road through Bisham and Marlow. The bridge was opened by Lord Hesketh on 24 May 1989, following a campaign by  Margaret Bowdery, a local advocate of access to open spaces and improvements to footpaths. As part of the campaign for the construction of the bridge she ran a "Golden Boot" appeal and raised over £2000 towards its construction. Formerly there was a ferry at this point which took the towpath across the river when it was used for towing barges. The ferry ceased operation in 1953.

The name "Temple" comes from Temple Mill Island which was owned by the Knights Templar and the site of a mill, which was used to create copper sheets used in the construction of ships for the Royal Navy. The mill had a large water wheel to drive the milling machinery.

In May 2019 the bridge was declared unsafe and closed to pedestrians. It was repaired and reopened in June of the same year.

It is a haunched girder bridge with a wooden deck. At , it is the longest hardwood bridge in Britain.

See also

 Crossings of the River Thames

References

Pedestrian bridges across the River Thames
Bridges completed in 1989
Bridges in Buckinghamshire
Bridges in Berkshire
Hurley, Berkshire